The 2MASX J00482185−2507365 occulting pair is a pair of overlapping spiral galaxies found in the vicinity of NGC 253, the Sculptor Galaxy. Both galaxies are more distant than NGC 253, with the background galaxy, 2MASX J00482185−2507365 (PGC 198197), lying at redshift z=0.06, about 800 million light-years from Earth, and the foreground galaxy lying between NGC 253 and the background galaxy (0.0008 < z < 0.06).

This pair of galaxies illuminates the distribution of galactic dust beyond the visible arms of a spiral galaxy. The heretofore unexpected extent of dust beyond the starry limits of the arms shows new areas for extragalactic astronomical study. The dusty arms extend six times the radii of the starry arms of the galaxy, and are shown silhouetted in HST images against the central and core sections of the background galaxy.

See also
AM 1316-241
NGC 3314

References

External links 
 NASA Galaxy Silhouettes
 NASA Hubblesite
Galaxy Silhouettes press release
Galaxy Silhouettes Fast Facts
 NASA Hubble Heritage Project
Overlapping Galaxies
in relation to NGC 253
original images
 SpaceSpin.org Galaxy Silhouettes

Overlapping galaxies
198197
J00482185−2507365
Unbarred spiral galaxies
Sculptor (constellation)